Fellow Travelers is an upcoming American historical television miniseries based on the 2007 fictional novel of the same name by Thomas Mallon. Starring Matt Bomer and Jonathan Bailey, it centers on the decades-long romance between two men who first meet during the height of McCarthyism in the 1950s.

Premise
After a chance encounter in Washington D.C. in the 1950s, Hawkins Fuller (Bomer) and Timothy Laughlin (Bailey) start a volatile romance that spans "the Vietnam War protests of the 1960s, the drug-fueled disco hedonism of the 1970s and the AIDS crisis of the 1980s, while facing obstacles in the world and in themselves".

Cast

Main
 Matt Bomer as Hawkins Fuller
 Jonathan Bailey as Tim Laughlin

Supporting 
 Allison Williams as Lucy Smith
 Jelani Alladin as Marcus Hooks
 Noah J. Ricketts as Frankie Hines
 Linus Roache as Senator Wesley Smith
 Will Brill as Cohn
 Chris Bauer as McCarthy
 Erin Neufer as Mary Johnson
 Matt Visser as David Schine
 Christine Horne as Jean Kerr

Production

Development
A television adaptation of Mallon's work was in development as a co-production from Fremantle for Showtime as of October 2021. Showtime officially greenlit the series in April 2022, with the screenplay written by Ron Nyswaner who also serves as executive producer. Other executive producers include Daniel Minahan, who is directing the first two episodes.

Casting
Alongside the greenlight announcement in April 2022, it was announced Matt Bomer would executive produce the series and star as Hawkins Fuller. Allison Williams joined the cast in June as Lucy Smith. It was announced in July that Jonathan Bailey would star opposite Bomer as Tim Laughlin.

Filming
Principal photography began in Toronto on July 27, 2022 and wrapped on December 9, 2022.

See also
 Fellow Travelers (opera)

References

External links
 

Upcoming drama television series
2020s LGBT-related drama television series
Cultural depictions of Joseph McCarthy
Gay-related television shows
Homophobia in fiction
Showtime (TV network) original programming
Television series based on American novels
Television shows filmed in Toronto
Television series set in the 1950s
Television series set in the 1960s
Television series set in the 1970s
Television series set in the 1980s
Television shows set in Washington, D.C.
Television series by Fremantle (company)
Television series by CBS Studios